Lukáš Černohorský (born 19 November 1984) is a Czech politician and IT analyst. He was the chairman of the Czech Pirate Party from August 2014 to April 2016 and a member of the Chamber of Deputies of the Parliament the from 2017 to 2021. In January 2018, he was appointed chairman of the OKD Commission of Inquiry.

Early life
Černohorský was born in Dlouhá Lhota in the Příbram District, before moving to Ostrava with his parents. In 2004, he graduated from the Secondary Industrial School of Electrical Engineering. He subsequently graduated in measurement and control technology at the VSB – Technical University of Ostrava in 2010.

He worked as an IT analyst and later as a test engineer until 2012.

He has been involved as a spokesman and member of the petitions committee, which works to preserve three historic buildings in Ostrava known as Ostravica-Textilia.

Political career
Černohorský is a member of the Czech Pirate Party. He was one of the co-founders of the Regional Association of Pirates in the Moravian-Silesian Region and was also its chairman.

In the municipal elections in 2010, he ran unsuccessfully for the Ostrava City Council, and later also failed to be elected in regional elections in 2012 in the Moravian-Silesian Region, as leader of the Pirate list.

He ran for the Pirates in the Moravian-Silesian Region in elections to the Chamber of Deputies in 2010 and in 2013, but was not elected.

He was elected chairman of the Czech Pirate Party at a national forum in Prague on 2 August 2014, receiving 78 votes. In the municipal elections in 2014, he was the lead candidate for the We are Ostrava coalition  a coalition of the Green Party and Pirates. However, the group did not get into the city council. He served as party chairman until April 2016.

In elections to the Czech Senate in 2016, Černohorský attempted to run in District No. 73 - Frýdek-Místek, but did not meet the legal age limit and his candidacy was not accepted. He was the leader of the Pirate list in the Moravian-Silesian Region in the regional elections in 2016, but again was not elected.

In the elections to the Chamber of Deputies in 2017, he was the leader of the Pirates in the Moravian-Silesian Region, and was elected as a deputy. In municipal elections in 2018, he ran for the Pirates for the Ostrava City Council, but was unsuccessful.

In the elections to the Chamber of Deputies in 2021, he was the lead candidate for the Pirates and Mayors coalition in the Moravian-Silesian Region, but was not re-elected.

References

1984 births
Living people
People from Příbram District
Leaders of the Czech Pirate Party
Technical University of Ostrava alumni
Members of the Chamber of Deputies of the Czech Republic (2017–2021)
Czech Pirate Party MPs